PCM (Prairie City Monroe) Community School District is a rural public school district headquartered on the grounds of Prairie City-Monroe High School in Monroe, Iowa. It has territory in Jasper and Marion counties, with some areas in Polk County, and serves Monroe, Prairie City, and Reasnor.

History
The district was established on July 1, 1991, as a merger of the Prairie City and Monroe school districts; the latter was known prior to July 1, 1978, as the New Monroe school district.

Early history
In 1910, Prairie City had 8 teachers and 233 students; Monroe had 5 teachers and 226 students; Reasoner had 2 teachers and 35 students.

Schools
The district operates four schools:
Monroe Elementary School, Monroe
Prairie City Elementary School, Prairie City
PCM Middle School (6-8), Prairie City
PCM High School (9-12), Monroe

See also
List of school districts in Iowa

References

External links
 PCM Community School District
 

School districts in Iowa
Education in Jasper County, Iowa
Education in Marion County, Iowa
Education in Polk County, Iowa
1991 establishments in Iowa
School districts established in 1991